Erin Jane Dean (born October 18, 1980) is an American actress. She is best known for her lead role as Robbie Stevenson in the television series The Journey of Allen Strange. She has also appeared as the lead actress in Lovers Lane, and in a supporting role as Mona in Lolita. On television, she has appeared in episodes of Boy Meets World, A Pig's Tale, Monty, Against the Grain, and Nickelodeon's game show Figure It Out.

References

External links

1980 births
Living people
American child actresses
American television actresses
People from Kennewick, Washington
Actresses from Washington (state)
20th-century American actresses
21st-century American women